Huntington Mall is an enclosed shopping mall in the village of Barboursville in Cabell County in the U.S. state of West Virginia. Currently the largest mall in West Virginia, it opened on 3 February 1981 and features more than 150 retailers. Anchor stores include Dick's Sporting Goods, Field & Stream, JCPenney, Macy's, and TJ Maxx & HomeGoods with two vacant anchors last occupied by Forever 21 and Sears. Other major tenants include Books-A-Million and Old Navy. The mall is owned by Cafaro Company of Youngstown, Ohio.

History

At the time, it included JCPenney, Lazarus, Stone & Thomas, and Sears as its anchor stores. When the mall's Foot Locker store opened, tennis player Bobby Riggs made an appearance at the mall, challenging mall employees to a game of tennis. Phar-Mor, a discount pharmacy chain, was later added to the mall as its fifth anchor in 1990.

Stone & Thomas was converted to Elder-Beerman in 1998 when the chain was acquired. A year later, Borders Books & Music opened its first West Virginia store at the mall. Old Navy, Steve & Barry's and local chain Dawahares were later added to the mall as well. After Phar-Mor closed in 2002, it became the second Dick's Sporting Goods in the state.

In mid-2008, it was announced that Cinemark would open a new movie theater at the mall, replacing the vacated six-screen complex that closed in 2006 and an adjacent cafeteria (which use to be Picadilly Cafeteria). This new theater opened in early 2009.
Borders Books closed in 2011, due to the company's bankruptcy. Books-A-Million later replaced it. Parent company The Bon-Ton closed the Elder-Beerman in the mall on January 31, 2016, and the space was split among Forever 21, TJ Maxx, and HomeGoods.

On August 6, 2019, Sears announced it would be closing its location at the mall in late October, while the auto center closed in late August.

On October 2, 2019, Forever 21 announced that it would also be closing in late 2019 after filing for Chapter 11 Bankruptcy.

A catchy Radio jingle from the 1980's/1990's was "Experience it all, at the Huntington Mall!"

Impact
Huntington Mall is the largest mall in the state of West Virginia. When the mall was built, the only other businesses around it were two bars and an Exxon gas station. Since the mall's opening, several retailers have built around the mall, including four motels and several restaurants, as well as a Walmart Supercenter, the first Best Buy in West Virginia, and the first Sheetz gas station/convenience store in southern West Virginia. Huntington Mall has also averaged $375 million in retail trade, significantly increasing the tax revenue for Barboursville's budgets.

References

External links
Huntington Mall website

Buildings and structures in Cabell County, West Virginia
Shopping malls in West Virginia
Shopping malls established in 1981
Tourist attractions in Cabell County, West Virginia
Cafaro Company